Malaysia competed at the 2022 ASEAN University Games in Ubon Ratchathani, Thailand from 26 July to 6 August 2022. The Malaysian contingent consisted of 275 athletes, competing in 19 out 23 sports.

Overall, the Malaysian contingent won 49 golds and was in second position and managed to reach the target of 45 gold medals.

Medal summary

Medal by sport

Medal by date

Medalists

Badminton 

Singles

Doubles

Team

Basketball 

Men's squad

Chan Yew Thung 
Chang Zi Fueng
Wee Yiang De	
Jing Hung Lee
Chee Li Wei
Zhong Shin Thea
Wee Yong Gan	
Jun Yuan Diong
Jason Lee Shu Wen	
Liew Wei Young
Yip Hong Chan
Anthony Liew Wen Qian

Women's squad

Carmen Chan 
Weng Yen Chan
Li Xuan Lee	
Chia Cheng Xuan
Lee Pei Ling
Nur Adila Shahira Juraimi
Mei Ling Chow	
Chia Qian Tai
Hee Heong Yee	
Sany Tan Suet Nie
Wei Yun Tan
Sze Qian Wong

Football 

Squad

Mohd Alief Najmi Mohd Radzi 
Ahmad Hijazi Mohd Muhyiddin
Muhammad Darwisy Abdullah	
Muhammad Zulkarnain Mohd Nasir
Mohamad Syahir Abdul Rahman
Syed Muhammad Irfan Syed Mohd Kamil
Zahrul Nizam Zamri	
Amirul Fazly Mohd Zamri
Muhammad Aliff Mohamad Muhazni
Muhammad Ibrahim Azfar Harun	
Amir Haziq Mohd Fadzli
Muhammad Aliff Najmi Shaaini
Abdul Hadi Muhammad
Adam Iskandar Mohd Isyak
Muhammad Iman Hakimi Aznan	
Nik Akmal Rezal Aminun Izham	
Saiful Iskandar Adha Saiful Azlan
Wan Syamil Sulaiman Wan Salman

Futsal 

Squad

Adam Arieef Ab Rahim 
Hamdin Zarif Mahmun
Iskandar Aliff	
Muhammad Alif Haiqal Asri
Amirul Aiman Hairol Nizan
Muhammad Hafizi Marzuki
Muhammad Haiqal Hasnor	
Muhammad Rashidie Mahadi
Muhammad Syarifuddin Md Akhir	
Zainulzahin Sinuan
Muhammad Arif Roslan
Ahmad Muazzim Ahmad Shakri
Mohd Farhan Arman

References 

2022 in Malaysian sport